Ash Fork Unified School District 31 is a public school district headquartered in Ash Fork, Arizona, United States.

In addition to serving Ash Fork in Yavapai County, it also serves Kaibab Estates West in Coconino County.

In 1984 the district had 136 pupils, with 14 on the teaching staff. The previous year the school district lost a teacher and stopped paying for food for student athletes since it had a $36,000 budget deficit. In 1988 the district had 177 students.

References

School districts in Coconino County, Arizona
School districts in Yavapai County, Arizona